Desperate Dreams is the fourth studio album by American country music singer Eddy Raven. It was released in September 1981 on Elektra Records.

Content and reception
Four singles were released from the album: "I Should've Called", "Who Do You Know in California", "A Little Bit Crazy", and "She's Playing Hard to Forget". All four charted within the top 20 of Hot Country Songs between 1981 and 1982.

Record World wrote of the album that Raven's "commercial potential has not yet been reached", while praising the vocal delivery on the singles. Tom Roland of Allmusic thought that the album had more creative control from Raven than its predecessors did.

Track listing
All songs written by Eddy Raven except as noted.
Side 1
"Desperate Dreams" - 2:48
"Who Do You Know in California" - 2:48
"You're Too Much for Me" (Jesse Winchester) - 3:09
"I Know You're the Rain" (Charlie Black, Rory Bourke) - 3:32
"I Should've Called" - 3:07

Side 2
"A Little Bit Crazy" - 2:16
"Thinking It Over" - 3:26
"She's Playing Hard to Forget" (Keith Stegall, Elroy Kahanek) - 2:22
"Young Girl" - 2:56
"Loving Arms and Lying Eyes" - 3:28

Personnel
Acoustic Guitar: Kenny Bell, Leo Jackson, Bobby Thompson, Paul Worley
Background Vocals: Dennis William Wilson
Bass Guitar: Bob Wray
Drums: Roger Clark
Electric Guitar: Fred Newell, Reggie Young
Keyboards: Randy McCormick
Lead Vocals: Eddy Raven
Sitar: Reggie Young
Steel Guitar: Sonny Garrish

Charts

Weekly charts

Year-end charts

References

1981 albums
Elektra Records albums
Eddy Raven albums
Albums produced by Jimmy Bowen